The 1945 Pittsburgh Panthers football team represented the University of Pittsburgh in the 1945 college football season.  The team compiled a 3–7 record under head coach Clark Shaughnessy.

Schedule

References

Pittsburgh
Pittsburgh Panthers football seasons
Pittsburgh Panthers football